Neminātha, also known as Nemi and Ariṣṭanemi, is the twenty-second  of Jainism in the present age. Neminatha lived 81,000 years before the 23rd Tirthankara Parshvanatha. According to traditional accounts, he was born to King Samudravijaya and Queen Shivadevi of the Yadu dynasty in the north Indian city of Sauripura. His birth date was the fifth day of Shravana Shukla of the Jain calendar. Krishna, who was the 9th and last Jain Vasudev, was his first cousin.

Neminatha, when heard the cries of animals being killed for his marriage feast, freed the animals and renounced his worldly life and became a Jain ascetic. The representatives of this event are popular in Jain art. He had attained moksha on Girnar Hills near Junagadh, and became a siddha, a liberated soul which has destroyed all of its karma. 

Along with Mahavira, Parshvanatha and Rishabhanatha, Neminatha is one of the twenty-four Tirthankaras who attract the most devotional worship among the Jains. His icons include the eponymous deer as his emblem, the Mahavenu tree, Sarvanha (Digambara) or Gomedha (Śhvētāmbara) Yaksha, and Ambika Yakshi.

Nomenclature
The name Neminatha consists of two Sanskrit words, Nemi which means "rim, felly of a wheel" or alternatively "thunderbolt", and natha which means "lord, patron, protector". 

According to the Jain text Uttarapurana, as well as the explanation of Acharya Hemchandra, it was the ancient Indian deity Indra who named the 22nd tirthankara as Neminatha, because he viewed the Jina as the "rim of the wheel of dharma".

In Svetambara Jain texts, his name Aristanemi came from a dream his mother had during pregnancy, where she saw a "wheel of Arista jewels". His full name is mentioned as Aristanemi which is an epithet of the sun-chariot. Neminatha's name is spelled close to the 21st tirthankara Naminatha.

Life

Neminatha was the twenty-second Tirthankara (ford-maker) of the avasarpiṇī (present descending cycle of Jain cosmology). Jain tradition place him as a contemporary of Krishna, the eighth and last vasudev. There was a gap of 581,750 years between the Neminatha and his predecessor, Naminatha as per traditional beliefs. He lived approx. 81,000 years before the 23rd Tirthankara, Parshvanatha as per the Trishashtishalakapursusha Charitra of Acharya Hemachandra.

Birth 

Neminatha is mentioned as the youngest son of king Samudravijaya and queen Shivadevi of the Yadu lineage, born at Sauripura (Dvaraka). He is believed to have become fond of animals in his early life due to being in a cattle-herding family. Jain legends place him in the Girnar-Kathiawad (in Saurashtra region of modern-day Gujarat). His birth date is believed to be the fifth day of Shravana Shukla of the Hindu calendar.

Life before renunciation 

He is believed to have been born with a dark-blue skin complexion, a very handsome but shy young man. His father is mentioned as the brother of Vasudeva, Krishna's father, therefore he is mentioned as the cousin of Krishna in Trishashti-salaka-purusha-charitra. Sculptures found in Kankali Tila, Mathura of Kushana period depicts Krishna and Balarama as cousins of Neminatha.

In one of the legends, on being taunted by Satyabhama, wife of Krishna, Neminatha is depicted to have blown Panchajanya, the mighty conch of Krishna through is nostrils. According to the texts, no one could lift the conch except Krishna, let alone blow it. After this event, Puranas state that Krishna decided to test Neminatha's strength and challenged him for a friendly duel. Neminatha, being a Tirthankara, is believed to have defeated Krishna easily. He is also mentioned as spinning the chakra (discuss, the primary weapon of Krishna) with the right leg toe during his childhood.

As a teacher 
In the war between Krishna and Jarasandha, Neminatha is believed to have participated alongside Krishna. This is believed to be the reason for celebrating Krishna-related festivals in Jainism and for intermingling with Hindus, who worship Krishna as one of the incarnations of Vishnu. 

Chandogya Upanishad, a religious text in Hinduism, mentions Angiras Ghora as the teacher of Krishna. He is believed to have taught Krishna the five vows, namely, honesty, asceticism, charity, non-violence and truthfulness. Ghora is identified as Neminatha by some scholars. Mahabharata mentions him as the teacher of the path of salvation to king Sagara. He may also be identified with a Scandinavian or Chinese deity, but such claims are not accepted generally.

Renunciation 

Jain tradition holds that the Neminatha's marriage was arranged with Rajulakumari or Rajimati or Rajamati, daughter of Ugrasena. Ugrasena is believed to be the king of Dvārakā and maternal grandfather of Krishna. He is believed to have heard animal cries as they were being slaughtered for the marriage feast. Taken over by sorrow and distress at the sight, he is believed to have given up the desire of getting married, and to have become a monk and gone to Mount Girnar. His bride-to-be Rajulakumari is believed to have followed him, becoming a nun and his brother Rathanemi became a monk, joining his ascetic order.

According to Kalpasutras, Neminatha led an ascetic life thereby eating only once every three days, meditated for 55 days and then obtained omniscience on Mount Raivataka, under a Mahavenu tree.

Disciples
According to Jain texts Neminatha had 11 Gandhara with Varadatta Svami as the leader of the Neminatha disciples. Neminatha's sangha (religious order) consisted of 18,000 sadhus (male monks) and 44,000 sadhvis (female monks) as per the mentions in Kalpa Sutra.

Nirvana 
He is said to have lived 1,000 years and spent many years spreading his knowledge and preaching principles of ahiṃsā (non-violence) and aparigraha (asceticism) in the Saurashtra region region. fHe is said to have attained moksha (nirvana) on the fifth peak or tonk (Urjayant Parvat) of Mount Girnar. Of these 1,000 years, he is believed to have spent 300 years as a bachelor, 54 days as an ascetic monk and 700 years as an omniscient being.

The yaksha and yakshi of Neminatha are Sarvanha (Digambara) or Gomedha (Śhvētāmbara) Yaksha, and Ambika Yakshi.

Legacy

Worship 

Along with Mahavira, Parshvanatha and Rishabhanatha, Neminatha is one of the twenty-four Tirthankaras who attract the most devotional worship among the Jains. Unlike the last two tirthankaras, historians consider Neminatha and all other tirthankaras to be legendary characters. Scenes from Neminatha's life are popular in Jain art. Jinastotrāņi is a collection of hymn dedicated to Neminatha along with Munisuvrata, Chandraprabha, Shantinatha, Mahavira, Parshvanatha and Rishabhanatha.

The yaksha and yakshi of Neminatha are Sarvanha and Ambika according to Digambara tradition and Gomedha and Ambika according to Śhvētāmbara tradition.

Samantabhadra's Svayambhustotra praises the twenty-four tirthankaras, and its eight shlokas (songs) adore Shantinatha. One such shloka reads:

Literature 

The Jain traditions about Neminatha are incorporated in the Harivamsa Purana of Jinasena. A palm leaf manuscript on the life of Neminatha, named Neminatha-Charitra, was written in 1198-1142 AD. It is now preserved in Shantinatha Bhandara, Khambhat. The incident where Neminatha is depicted as blowing Krishna's mighty conch is given in Kalpa Sūtra.

Rajul's love for Neminatha is described in the Rajal-Barahmasa (an early 14th-century poem of Vijayachandrasuri). The separation of Rajul and Neminatha has been a popular theme among Jain poets who composed Gujarati fagus, a poetry genre. Some examples are Neminatha Fagu (1344) by Rajshekhar, Neminatha Fagu (1375) by Jayashekhar and Rangasagara Neminatha Fagu (1400) by Somsundar. The poem Neminatha Chatushpadika (1269) by Vinaychandra depicted the same story. 

Arddha Nemi, the "Unfinished Life of Nemi", is an incomplete epic by Janna, one of the most influential Kannada poets of the 13th century. Nemidutam composed by Acharya Jinasena, 9th century, is an adoration of Neminatha. 

Neminatha, along with Rishbhanatha and the Śramaṇa tradition, has been mentioned in the Rigveda. Neminatha is also referred to in Yajurveda.

Iconography 

Neminatha is believed to have had the same dark-bluish-colored skin as Krishna. Painting depicting his life stories generally identifies him as dark-coloured. His iconographic identifier is a conch carved or stamped below his statues. Sometimes, as with Vishnu's iconography, a chakra is also shown near him, as in the 6th-century sculpture found at the archaeological site near Padhavali (Madhya Pradesh). Artworks showing Neminatha sometimes include Ambika yakshi, but her colour varies from golden to greenish to dark-blue, by region. 

The earliest known image of Neminatha was found in Kankali Tila dating back to c. 18 CE.

Temples 

Neminatha is one of the five most devotionally revered Tirthankaras, along with Mahavira, Rishabhanatha, Parshvanatha and Shantinatha. Various Jain temple complexes across India feature him, and these are important pilgrimage sites in Jainism. Mount Girnar of Gujarat, for example, which is believed to have been a place where Neminatha is believed to have achieved nirvana.

Luna Vasahi in Dilwara Temples,  built in 1230 by two Porwad brothers - Vastupala and Tejpal, considered famous for ellaborate architecture and intricate carvings. The ceilings of the temple depicts scenes of the life of Neminatha with image of Rajmathi (who was to marry Neminatha) and Krishna. Shanka Basadi in Lakshmeshwara, built in 7th century, is considered one of the most important temple built by Kalyani Chalukyas. The temple derives its name from the image of Neminatha in kayotsarga posture standing on a large shankha (conch shell). The unique feature of this temple is a monolithic pillar with the carving of 1008 Tirthankaras known as Sahasrakuta Jinabimba. Adikavi Pampa wrote Ādi purāṇa, seated in this basadi (temple) during 9th century.

Important Neminatha temple complexes include Tirumalai (Jain complex), Kulpakji,  Arahanthgiri Jain Math, Nemgiri, Bhand Dewal, Bhand Dewal in Arang and Odegal basadi

See also

 God in Jainism
 Arihant (Jainism)

References

Citations

Sources

Books

Web 

 
 

Neminatha
Tirthankaras
longevity myths
Indian Jain monks